Westel Woodbury Willoughby (20 July 1867 – 25 March 1945) was an American academic.

He and his twin brother to William F. Willoughby were the sons of Westel Willoughby and Jennie Rebecca (Woodbury) Willoughby. Their lawyer father had been  Major in the Union Army with the New York Volunteers, and after retiring due to injuries incurred at the Battle of Chancellorsville, served as a local prosecutor, then briefly as a trial judge and on the Supreme Court of Appeals for Virginia.

Westel Woodbury Willoughby graduated with an A.B. from Johns Hopkins University in the class of 1888, continued with graduate work and received his Ph.D from Hopkins in 1891 at a time when political science was not yet recognized as a separate discipline. His degree was awarded by the combined departments of history and economics.

On 27 June 1893, he married Grace Robinson, daughter of Franklin Marvin Robinson, a prominent lawyer in Dubuque, Iowa. After practicing law for a few years with his father in Washington, D.C., Westel W. Willoughby joined the faculty at Hopkins. He moved to Maryland, and with his wife Grace and their two young children Westel Robinson Willoughby (Robinson) and Laura Robinson Willoughby in Baltimore's Roland Park neighborhood in Maryland.

At Professor Willoughby's urging, Johns Hopkins created the first department of Political Science, with him as the only professor. He continued to lead this department until retiring at the age of 65 in 1932. He helped to found the American Political Science Association and served as its 10th President. Some have referred to him as the "father of modern political science" due to his prolific publications. His first book, The Nature of the State was published in 1898. He went on to establish himself as one of the foremost authorities on Constitutional Law and the workings of the Supreme Court of the United States.

Willoughby was invited as a guest lecturer to China when he responded to a request from the Chinese Government in 1917 to assist as a Constitutional and Legal advisor for a period of one year. As a result of this work, he became a frequent advisor to the Chinese Government, including the Washington Naval Conference in 1921 and the two Opium Conferences in Geneva in 1924–1925 and again in 1931 where Willoughby also served as advisor to the Chinese delegation to the League of Nations. His numerous writings on China and Japan and their relationships prior to World War II are classics that are still used in education to this day. The Chinese Government awarded him the Order of Merit and the Order of the Golden Grain in appreciation for his contribution.

His wife Grace, predeceased him by nearly 30 years, dying in 1907 at the age of just 36, and was buried at Linwood Cemetery in her hometown of Dubuque. Thus, the widower raised his two young children alone and never remarried. Along with his twin brother William Franklin Willoughby, an accomplished economist and political scientist, he bought a small island called Endiang on Stoney Lake north of Toronto in 1908 where both families spent their summers.

Dr. Willoughby continued to live in Baltimore until his death on 25 March 1945.

External links

References

American political scientists
1867 births
1945 deaths
American twins
Johns Hopkins University alumni
Johns Hopkins University faculty
Fellows of the American Academy of Arts and Sciences
People from Alexandria, Virginia